Eleta Kingsley Oshiokha (born 29 October 1989) is a Nigerian professional footballer who plays as a forward for Abahani Limited Dhaka in the Bangladesh Football Premier League. Born in Nigeria, Eleta obtained Bangladeshi citizenship in 2021, through naturalization.

Club career
Eleta started his football career at an early age, enrolling in Nigerian academies. He began his senior career with Nigeria club Gabros International FC. Afterwards, he played for Dolphin FC. From 2009 to 2011, he played for Nigerian club Akwa United F.C. 

Afterwards, he left Nigeria and went to Uzbekistan, but due to work permit and other complications, he had to leave that country, ultimately heading to Bangladesh on the advice of a friend. He played in a match between foreigners and national team players, impressing and receiving offers from many top Bangladeshi clubs such as Abahani Limited Dhaka and Sheikh Jamal DC, but instead signed for Arambagh KS as he had made a prior commitment with them. He scored a hat trick in his first Bangladesh Premier League match in 2012 against Sheikh Jamal DC.

In 2012, Eleta signed for Team BJMC.

In 2013, he joined Muktijoddha Sangsad KC.

In 2015, he played with Chittagong Abahani in the 2015 Sheikh Kamal International Club Cup, winning the tournament and finishing as top scorer with 5 goals, and earning the man of the match award in the final, as well as Tournament Most Valuable Player.

Afterwards, he returned to Team BJMC, staying with the club through 2019. In a 2016 Independence Cup match, he scored 5 goals in a 6-0 victory over Feni Soccer Club. He went on a brief loan for a few days in 2019 to Bashundhara Kings.

In 2019, he returned to Arambagh KS.

In 2021, he signed for the Bashundhara Kings. On 18 May 2022, he made his AFC Cup debut against Maziya.

In 2022, he signed for Dhaka Abahani.

International career
Eligible for the Nigeria by birth, Kingsley obtained Bangladeshi citizenship in 2021, through naturalization, becoming the first foreign footballer to obtain a Bangladeshi passport. He was named to the preliminary squad for the Bangladesh national team for the 2021 SAFF Championship, but was unable to represent the team due to not obtaining the clearance from FIFA in time to be eligible. In March 2023, he was named to the provisional squad ahead of a set of friendlies.

Career statistics

Personal life
Born in Nigeria, Eleta lives in Bashundhara Residential Area with Bangladeshi wife Liza, whom he married in May 2012. The couple has a daughter named Safira. He applied for Bangladeshi citizenship in 2014, with it being granted in 2021.

Honours
Chittagong Abahani
Sheikh Kamal International Club Cup: 2015

Individual
Sheikh Kamal International Club Cup Top Scorer: 2015
Independence Cup Top Scorer: 2016

External links

References

 

1989 births
Living people
Association football forwards
Akwa United F.C. players
Nigeria Professional Football League players
Nigerian footballers
Dolphin F.C. (Nigeria) players
Ifeanyi Ubah F.C. players
Kwara United F.C. players
Gateway United F.C. players
Nigerian emigrants to Bangladesh
Bangladeshi people of Nigerian descent
Naturalised citizens of Bangladesh
Arambagh KS players
Team BJMC players
Muktijoddha Sangsad KC players
Abahani Limited (Chittagong) players
Bashundhara Kings players
Bangladesh Football Premier League players
Nigerian expatriate footballers